TriStar Productions (TSP) is an American film and television production company, a division of TriStar Pictures and a joint venture between Sony Pictures Entertainment (SPE) and former 20th Century Fox chairman Tom Rothman.

The new company shares its name and logo with the current TriStar Pictures distribution label of Sony Pictures, under which TriStar Productions' four films per year will be released joining the other titles released from Sony Pictures Worldwide Acquisitions.  The television programming however, will be produced for Sony Pictures Television. The TriStar name was selected as Rothman considers himself a film buff, giving the company its historical name, and counting on the good will of the Hollywood creative types to give the unit an edge.

History 
It was jointly announced on August 1, 2013, by Rothman, Michael Lynton, the CEO of Sony Entertainment and co-chairman and CEO of SPE, and Amy Pascal, co-chairwoman of SPE. The venture was launched on September 1 and Rothman would hold an equity share in the venture with the ability to bring in other outside investments. TriStar Productions' first deal was for the autobiography To Walk the Clouds, which is about Philippe Petit, a French high wire walker who walked between the Twin Towers in 1974.

In February 2015, it was announced that Rothman will replace Amy Pascal as chairman of Sony Pictures's Motion Picture Group. Rothman will continue to oversee the properties he greenlit at TriStar.

Filmography

Released

Upcoming

References 

2013 establishments in California
Mass media companies established in 2013
Film production companies of the United States
Entertainment companies based in California

Sony Pictures Entertainment
Companies based in Culver City, California
Joint ventures
Sony subsidiaries